Ashley Ruth Wheeler (born August 6, 1986) was crowned Miss Vermont 2008 on Saturday, April 26, 2008, in Barre, Vermont.

Personal life
Wheeler was born in St. Johnsbury, Vermont, to Michael & Donna Ellsworth Wheeler. She grew up in Lyndonville, Vermont.

Miss America
Her vocal talent was singing "The Prayer."  Ashley's platform is Political Awareness Among Young Voters.  She was competing for the title of Miss America 2009 in Las Vegas, Nevada in January and she won a Preliminary Talent Award for her a cappella vocal performance of "God Bless America."  This marked the first time a representative of the state of Vermont won a preliminary award at the Miss America Pageant.

References

External links
 

Living people
People from Lyndonville, Vermont
Miss America 2009 delegates
Beauty pageant contestants from Vermont
American beauty pageant winners
Miss America Preliminary Talent winners
1986 births